Lielie Tjapši (Ludz: Jānikülä or Sūreq Tsäpsiq) is a small village located in the extreme eastern part of Pilda, Latgale. The last native speakers of Ludza lived in Lielie Tjapši, the dialect persisted there because of Antoņina Nikonova who was a passionate speaker of Ludza. Lielie Tjapši is very small and only has a few houses.

See also 
 Ludza dialect
 Latgale

References

External links 
Pictures of Lielie Tjapši and Ludza villages 

Towns and villages in Latvia